Gorani also known by its main dialect; Hawrami (ھەورامی,  Hewramî) is a Northwestern Iranian language spoken by ethnic Kurds in northeastern Iraq and eastern Iran and which with Zaza constitute the Zaza–Gorani languages. All the Gorani dialects are influenced by Kurdish lexically and morphologically. Gorani is considered a Kurdish dialect by many researchers. Some consider it a literary language for Kurds, and the speakers of Gorani call their language "Kurdish"

Gorani has four dialects: Bajelani, Hawrami, Sarli and Shabaki and is spoken in Iraq and Iran. Of these, Hawrami was the traditional literary language and koiné of Kurds in the historical Ardalan region at the Zagros Mountains, but has since been supplanted by Central Kurdish and Southern Kurdish.

Etymology
The name Goran appears to be of Indo-Iranian origin. The name may be derived from the old Avestan word, gairi, which means mountain.

Literature

Under the independent rulers of Ardalan (9th–14th / 14th–19th century), with their capital latterly at Sanandaj, Gorani became the vehicle of a considerable corpus of poetry. Gorani was and remains the first language of the scriptures of the Ahl-e Haqq sect, or Yarsanism, centered on Gahvara. Prose works, in contrast, are hardly known. The structure of Gorani verse is very simple and monotonous. It consists almost entirely of stanzas of two rhyming half-verses of ten syllables each, with no regard to the quantity of syllables.

Names of forty classical poets writing in Gurani are known, but the details of the lives and dates are unknown for the most part. Perhaps the earliest writer is Mele Perîşan, author of a masnavi of 500 lines on the Shi'ite faith who is reported to have lived around 1356–1431. Other poets are known from the 17th–19th centuries and include Shaykh Mustafa Takhtayi, Khana Qubadi, Yusuf Yaska, Mistefa Bêsaranî and Khulam Rada Khan Arkawazi. One of the last great poets to complete a book of poems (divan) in Gurani is Mawlawi Tawagozi south of Halabja.

Kurdish Shahnameh is a collection of epic poems that has been passed down through speech from one generation to the next, that eventually some stories were written down by Almas Khan-e Kanoule'ei in the eighteenth century. There exist also a dozen or more long epic or romantic masnavis, mostly translated by anonymous writers from Persian literature including: Bijan and Manijeh, Khurshid-i Khawar, Khosrow and Shirin, Layla and Majnun, Shirin and Farhad, Haft Khwan-i Rostam and Sultan Jumjuma.  Manuscripts of these works are currently preserved in the national libraries of Berlin, London, and Paris.

Example of Gorani poetry 
Şîrîn û Xesrew  written in 1740 by Khana Qubadî.

Dialects

Bajelani 
Bajelani is a Gorani dialect with about 59,000 speakers, predominately around Mosul, near Khanaqin and near the Khosar valley.

Hawrami
Hawrami (هەورامی; Hewramî) also known as Avromani, Awromani or Horami, is a Gorani dialect and is regarded as the most archaic one. It is mostly spoken in the Hawraman region, a mountainous region located in western Iran (Iranian Kurdistan) and northeastern Iraq (Iraqi Kurdistan). There are around 23,000 speakers, and it was classed as "definitely endangered" by UNESCO in 2010.

Due to concerns with the decline of Hawrami speakers, as people move away from the Hawraman region to cities like Erbil, Jamal Habibullah Faraj Bedar, a retired teacher from Tawela, decided to translate the Qur'an from Arabic into Hawrami. The translation took two and a half months and 1000 copies of the publication were printed in Tehran.

Sarli 
Sarli is spoken in northern Iraq by a cluster of villages north of the Little Zab river, on the confluence of the Khazir River and the Great Zab river, just west-northwest of the city of Kirkuk. Many speakers have been displaced by conflicts in the region. It is reportedly most similar to Bajelani but is also similar to Shabaki. It contains Kurdish, Turkish and Persian influences, like its neighbours Bajelani and Shabaki.

Shabak

Phonology

Consonants 

All voiceless plosives and affricates are aspirated.

 A glottal stop [ʔ] may be heard before a word-initial vowel, but is not phonemic.
 Sounds /ʕ ʁ/ only occur in loanwords.
 /x/ can also be heard as [χ] among different dialects.
 /q/ can also be aspirated as [qʰ].
 The voiced /d/ may be lenited in post-vocal positions, and occur as a voiced dental approximant [ð̞]. In the Nawsud dialects, /d/ can be heard as an alveolar approximant sound [ɹ], and may also be devoiced when occurring in word-final positions as [ɹ̥].
 In the Nawsud and Nodša dialects, a word-initial /w/ can be heard as a [v] or a labialized [vʷ].
 /n/ when preceding velar consonants, is heard as a velar nasal [ŋ].

Vowels 

 Sounds /æ ə/ both can be realized as an open-mid [ɛ].

Hawrami Grammar

Nouns 

 Hawrami distinguishes between two genders and two cases; Masculine & Feminine, and Nominative & Oblique. The two cases are otherwise referred to as the Direct and Indirect Cases

Masculine and Feminine, and Nominative and Oblique

Gender distinctions in nouns are indicated by a combination of final stress and vowel/consonant ending. Masculine nouns in the nominative form are indicated by a stressed "-O", -I", "-U", "-A", "-Á" and all consanant endings. Feminine nouns are indicated by an unstressed "-A", "-I", a stressed "-E" and rarely, a stressed "-Á".

There are 3 declensions. The declensions of each gender will be demonstrated as example

First Declension (Masculine Consonant Ending; Feminine Short Unstressed Vowel Ending)

 Masculine : Kur (Boy)
 Feminine : Xá'tuna (Queen)

Second Declension (Masculine Stressed Short Vowel Ending; Feminine Stressed "-E" Ending)

 Masculine : Yá'na (House)
 Feminine : Ná'mé (Name)

Third Declension (Stressed Long "-A" Ending)

 Masculine : Piá (Man)
 Feminine : Da'gá (Village)

Source

Note: " ' " indicates syllable followed will be stressed

In Hawrami, definiteness and indefiniteness is marked by two independent suffixes, "-ew", and "-(a)ka".
These suffixes decline for case and gender. The indefinite suffix "-ew" is declined by the first declension pattern while the definite suffix 
"-(a)ka" follows the second declension paradigm

Pronouns

Gallery

References

Textbooks

External links

 The Dialect of Awroman( Hawraman-i Luhon) by D.N.MacKenzie
 Ergativity and Role-Marking in Hawrami by Anders Holmberg, University of Newcastle & CASTL  and David Odden, Ohio State University
 The Noun Phrase in Hawrami by Anders Holmberg, University of Newcastle & CASTL and David Odden, Ohio State University

Northwestern Iranian languages
Endangered languages
Endangered Iranian languages
Endangered languages of Iran
Endangered languages of Iraq
Languages of Kurdistan